Marfin Investment Group (also known as MIG) is a Greek investment company. It has acquired several companies and has changed name several times since. In 2004 it took the name Marfin Financial Group following the triple merger of Comm Group, Marfin Classic Α.Ε.Ε.Χ and Maritime and Financial Investments.

Its shares are currently listed on the Athens Stock Exchange.

History

Finance history 
In 2006 the Dubai Group bought a 35% stake in the company. , 17.28% of MIG is owned by Dubai Group.
In 2006 Marfin Investment Group acquired HSBC's shares in the now-defunct Laiki Bank, establishing a strong minority share position. Subsequently, the group acquired control of Laiki, which it re-branded as Marfin Popular Bank.

On 17 March 2008, MIG announced it sold its 20% of Greek telecommunications company OTE to Deutsche Telekom.

On 6 March 2009, MIG won the deal to acquire Olympic Airlines making it a private airline. The airline was renamed Olympic Air soon after. On 22 February 2010, Olympic Air and main competitor Aegean Airlines announced they had reached an agreement to merge their operations, phasing out the Aegean brand. After an in depth inquiry by the European competitions commission, it was announced on 26 January 2011 that the merger was blocked, citing anticompetitive concerns. Following a renewed attempt to sell the company to Aegean Airlines and the subsequent approval by the Competition Commissioner on 10 October 2013, the airline is, as of 23 October 2013, a full subsidiary of Aegean Airlines.

In December 2009, MIG announced their intention in purchasing Serbian airline Jat Airways with an eventual merger with Olympic Air.

On 12 August 2014 Marfin Investment Group Holdings S.A (“MIG”) announces that it has sold its entire participation in MIG Real Estate REIC amounting to a stake 34.96% 
corresponding to 4,920,000 shares, to NBG Pangaea REIC for a cash consideration of 
€12.3m. The transaction consideration corresponds to a value of €2.50 per share,
implying a premium of approximately 25% to the closing price of €2.01 per share on 
August 11, 2014.

On 3 July 2015, MIG announced  the signing of the agreement for the sale of its stake in FAI rent-ajetAG (25,500 shares corresponding to 51% stake) and in FAI Asset Management
GmbH (5,000,001 shares corresponding to 50.1% stake) to the minority shareholder
Axtmann Holdings AG and to members of the Axtmann family. The transaction
consideration including dividend payment is €25.2m in cash payable in instalments.

On 7 December 2015, MIG announced  that, following the decision of the Board of Directors, it accepted today a binding offer from «SWISSPORT AVIAREPS HELLAS S.A.» to sell the entire stake in
Skyserv Handling Services S.A. (hereinafter “Skyserv Handling Services”). The
transaction consideration is €18m in cash payable in instalments, of which an
amount of €10m payable upon completion of the transfer of shares and the
remaining consideration payable in three (3) annual instalments.

On 14 June 2017, MIG following its announcement on 21.3.2017 hereby notifies the investors of the completion of the sale of the total number of shares held in the company “SUNCE KONCERN d.d.” corresponding to 49,99% of its share capital to the company “SUNCE ULAGANJA d.o.o.” controlled by the Andabak family. The consideration of the transaction amounting to € 43m. was fully paid in cash and will be used, after covering the transaction expenses, for the repayment of existing loan obligations of the Company.

Arson attack on Athens branch 
On May 5, 2010 during anti-austerity demonstrations, an arson attack by unidentified perpetrators took place against the bank's branch on Stadiou Street, Athens. 3 people died and in a trial that ended in 2013, several people in management positions were found guilty of the negligent homicide of three employees, the bodily harm of 21 other employees, and multiple lapses in fire safety measures and training of the staff.

Holdings
As of June 2017, MIG's principal equity holdings consisted of:
  Attica Holdings (Attica Group) (89.4% owned)
  Blue Star Ferries
  Superfast Ferries (100% owned)
  Hilton Cyprus (75.1% owned)
  HYGEIA (70.4% owned)
  Alpha Lab
  Aniz
  Biocheck
  Leto
  Mitera
  Polyiatreio Dytikis Athinas Protovathmia Iatriki
  Stem Health
  Y-Logimed
  Robne kuće Beograd (83.11% owned)
  SingularLogic (85.7% owned)
  DSMS
  PCS
  SingularLogic Bulgaria
  SingularLogic Cyprus
  SingularLogic Integrator
  SingularLogic Romania
  System Soft
  Vivartia (92.1% owned)
  Barba Stathis (100% owned)
  Alesis (51% owned)
  Bulzymco ltd (100% owned)
  Alesis Bulgaria EOOD (100% owned)
  M. Arabatzis (Elliniki Zymi) (49% owned)
  Uncle Stathis EOD Bulgaria (100% owned)
  Delta (100% owned)
  Charalambides Christis (10% owned)
  Evrotrofes (100% owned)
  United Milk Company (100% owned)
  Vigla Olympus (100% owned)
  Goody's (100% owned)
 Goody's shops
  Everest (100% owned)
  Everest shops
  Everest Trofodotiki (100% owned)
  La Pasteria (50% owned)
  La Pasteria shops
  Olympic Catering  (74.73% owned)
  Olympus Plaza (59% owned)
  Olympus Plaza Catering (51% owned)
  Greenfood (78.97% owned)
  Hellenic Catering (98.28% owned)
  Hellenic Food Investments (52.92% owned)
 Goody's shops
  Select Nendos (31.45% owned)

References

External links

Financial services companies established in 1998
Private equity firms of Greece
Greek brands
Companies listed on the Athens Exchange